Matt Berg is the CEO of Ona, which he co-founded with Peter Lubell-Doughtie, Ukang'a Dickson and Roger Wong. Previously, he was the ICT Director for the Millennium Villages Project at Columbia University’s Earth Institute, the Technology Director for ChildCount+, and a member of Columbia University’s Department of Mechanical Engineering research group in the Fu Foundation School of Engineering and Applied Science. In 2010 Berg was included in the Time 100 Most Influential People of the World.

See also
Time 100
Earth Institute
Columbia University
Knox College

References

External links 
 Mobile Active Press Release
 Knox.edu
 Time 100
 Earth Institute Blog
 Earth Institute press review
 ChildCount.org
 Millennium Villages Project
 Ona Systems

Columbia School of Engineering and Applied Science faculty
1977 births
Columbia University people
Businesspeople in information technology
Living people
Thunderbird School of Global Management alumni
American chief executives